Sibiryakov Island (Ostrov Sibiryakova) is a Russian island in the Peter the Great Gulf, in the Sea of Japan.

Islands of Russia
Islands of Primorsky Krai